The Americas Zone is one of three zones of regional Davis Cup competition in 2008.

Group I

Group II

Bolivia and El Salvador relegated to Group III in 2009.
Ecuador promoted to Group I in 2009.

Group III
Venue: Country Club, Tegucigalpa, Honduras (hard)
Date: 16–20 July

Scores in italics carried over from groups

Guatemala and Jamaica promoted to Group II in 2009
Aruba and Panama relegated to Group IV in 2009

Group IV
Venue: Country Club, Tegucigalpa, Honduras (hard)
Date: 16–20 July
Withdrawn: Trinidad and Tobago

Costa Rica and Haiti promoted to Group III in 2009.

See also
Davis Cup structure

 
Americas
Davis Cup Americas Zone